The Salesman and Bernadette is a 1998 album by Vic Chesnutt. The backing musicians on the album are from the American alternative country group Lambchop.

Track listing
All songs written by Vic Chesnutt
"Duty Free" – 3:13
"Bernadette and Her Crowd" – 3:40
"Replenished" – 4:20
"Maiden" – 3:02
"Until the Led" – 3:38
"Scratch, Scratch, Scratch" – 2:53
"Mysterious Tunnel" – 5:42
"Arthur Murray" – 4:07
"Prick" – 3:08
"Woodrow Wilson" – 3:52
"Parade" – 7:02
"Blanket Over The Head" – 1:26
"Square Room" – 4:29
"Old Hotel" – 4:20

Personnel
Musicians
Vic Chesnutt – Acoustic Guitar/Electric Guitar/bass Guitar/Piano/Vocals
Emmylou Harris – Vocals
Mike Doster – Bass
Kurt Wagner – Electric Guitar/Recorder/Lap Steel Guitar/Human Whistle/Vocals
Tina Chesnutt – Bass/Electric Guitar/Human Whistle/Vocals
Alex McManus – Euphonium/Electric Guitar/Accordion/Vocals/Human Whistle
Paul Niehaus – Pedal Steel/Electric Guitar/Baritone Saxophone/Percussion/Human Whistle
Paul Burch – Accordion/ Vibraphone/ Fender Rhodes/Human Whistle
Deanna Varagona – Baritone Saxophone/Percussion/Vocals/Human Whistle
Marc William Trovillion – Bass/Percussion/Human Whistle/Vocals
Allen Lowrey – Drums/Percussion/Human Whistle/Vocals
Dennis Cronin – Trumpet/Human Whistle
Jonathan Marx – Clarinet/Trumpet/Percussion/Human Whistle
John Delworth – Hammond Organ/ Farfisa Organ/Vocals

Engineering
Dennis Cronin – Engineer
Mark Nevers – Engineering/Mixing
Tommy Dorsey – Mastering

References 

1998 albums
Vic Chesnutt albums